Therapon may refer to:

Initial name for Zyzzyx, a genus of wasps
Junior homonym for Terapon, a genus of fish